is a Japanese manga artist.

Works
Kyō no Asuka Show (2009-2013), adapted into an anime.
Manekoi (-2013)
Kuchibiru ni uta o (2013-2014), based on a novel of the same name by Eiichi Nakata. A film adaptation has been released in February 2015.
Radiation House (2015-)
Naa-tan to Goshujin-tama (2015)
Asoko de Hataraku Musubu-san (2017-), story and art.

References

External links
 

1976 births
Living people
Manga artists from Mie Prefecture